Andricus parmula, also known as the disc gall wasp, is a species of gall-forming wasp in the genus Andricus. It induces galls in a wide selection of oak species, including hybrids. The galls are disc-shaped, up to 3 mm in diameter, and pale with red streaking. Adult females emerge in April.

References

External links 

 Andricus parmula on gallformers

Cynipidae
Gall-inducing insects
Oak galls